"Miss Narcissist" is a song by American alternative rock musician Courtney Love. Written by Jake Sinclair, it was released as a standalone single by the independent label Ghost Ramp. 

It was initially released as a digital download on May 18, 2015, and then subsequently issued on 7" vinyl later the same year. The physical release features the track "Killer Radio" as a b-side.

Release
The single debuted as a digital download on May 18, 2015, when Love was accompanying Lana Del Rey as an opening act on her Endless Summer Tour, and was performed live during these shows.

Artwork
The album's cover art was hand-drawn by Love herself.

Track listing
Digital download
"Miss Narcissist" – 3:09

7" vinyl
"Miss Narcissist" – 3:09
"Killer Radio"

Release history

References

2015 singles
2015 songs
Courtney Love songs
Songs written by Courtney Love